Tangled Trails is a 1921 American silent Western film directed by Charles Bartlett and starring Neal Hart and Violet Palmer. The film is also known as Sands of Sacrifice.

Plot
As described in a film magazine, Corporal Jack Borden (Hart) of the Royal Canadian Mounted Police is assigned to arrest Phil Lawson (Roseman), a crooked mine promoter, on suspicion of murder. Discarding his uniform, Jack follows Phil to New York City and overtakes him just in time to rescue a stenographer from Lawson's clutches. Lawson escapes and, with Jack on his trail, foes to an underworld retreat. Jack overtakes him and is victorious in another battle, but the promoter escapes again. Still on his trail, Jack follows his man back to Canada where, after several fistfights, he finally captures Lawson and sent to pay for his crimes. Jack is finally able to return to his wife Milly (Palmer), from whom he has been long separated.

Cast
 Neal Hart as Cpl Jack Borden
 Violet Palmer as Milly
 Gladys Hampton as Blanche Hall
 Jean Barry as Mrs Hall
 Jules Cowles as The Stranger
 Edward Roseman as Phil Lawson
 John Lowell as Granger (uncredited)

Survival status
Copies of Tangled Trails survive and the film has been released on DVD.

References

External links

 
 
 

1921 films
1921 Western (genre) films
1920s crime films
1920s romance films
American action films
American black-and-white films
Films directed by Charles Bartlett
Articles containing video clips
Royal Canadian Mounted Police in fiction
Silent American Western (genre) films
1920s American films